Knut Hamsun (4 August 1859 – 19 February 1952) was a Norwegian writer who was awarded the Nobel Prize in Literature in 1920. Hamsun's work spans more than 70 years and shows variation with regard to consciousness, subject, perspective and environment. He published more than 20 novels, a collection of poetry, some short stories and plays, a travelogue, works of non-fiction and some essays.

Hamsun is considered to be "one of the most influential and innovative literary stylists of the past hundred years" (ca. 1890–1990). He pioneered psychological literature with techniques of stream of consciousness and interior monologue, and influenced authors such as Thomas Mann, Franz Kafka, Maxim Gorky, Stefan Zweig, Henry Miller, Hermann Hesse, John Fante, Charles Bukowski and Ernest Hemingway. Isaac Bashevis Singer called Hamsun "the father of the modern school of literature in his every aspect—his subjectiveness, his fragmentariness, his use of flashbacks, his lyricism. The whole modern school of fiction in the twentieth century stems from Hamsun". Since 1916, several of Hamsun's works have been adapted into motion pictures. On 4 August 2009, the Knut Hamsun Centre was opened in Hamarøy.

The young Hamsun objected to realism and naturalism. He argued that the main object of modernist literature should be the intricacies of the human mind, that writers should describe the "whisper of blood, and the pleading of bone marrow". Hamsun is considered the "leader of the Neo-Romantic revolt at the turn of the 20th century", with works such as Hunger (1890), Mysteries (1892), Pan (1894), and Victoria (1898). His later works—in particular his "Nordland novels"—were influenced by the Norwegian new realism, portraying everyday life in rural Norway and often employing local dialect, irony, and humour. Hamsun only published one poetry collection, The Wild Choir, which has been set to music by several composers.

Hamsun had strong anti-English views, and openly supported Adolf Hitler and Nazi ideology. Due to his professed support for the German occupation of Norway, he was charged with treason after the war. He was not convicted, due to what was deemed psychological problems and issues with old age.

Biography

Early life
Knut Hamsun was born as Knud Pedersen in Lom in the Gudbrandsdal valley of Norway. He was the fourth son (of seven children) of Tora Olsdatter and  Peder Pedersen.  When he was three, the family moved to Hamsund, Hamarøy in Nordland. They were poor and an uncle had invited them to farm his land for him.

At nine Knut was separated from his family and lived with his uncle Hans Olsen, who needed help with the post office he ran. Olsen used to beat and starve his nephew, and Hamsun later stated that his chronic nervous difficulties were due to the way his uncle treated him.

In 1874 he finally escaped back to Lom. For the next five years he did any job for money; he was a store clerk, peddler, shoemaker's apprentice, sheriff's assistant, and an elementary-school teacher.

At 17 he became a ropemaker's apprentice; at about the same time he started to write. He asked businessman Erasmus Zahl to give him significant monetary support, and Zahl agreed. Hamsun later used Zahl as a model for the character Mack appearing in his novels Pan (1894), Dreamers (1904), Benoni (1908) and Rosa (1908).

He spent several years in America, traveling and working at various jobs, and published his impressions under the title Fra det moderne Amerikas Aandsliv (1889).

Early literary career

Working all those odd jobs paid off, and he published his first book: Den Gaadefulde: En Kjærlighedshistorie fra Nordland (The Enigmatic Man: A Love Story from Northern Norway, 1877). It was inspired from the experiences and struggles he endured from his jobs.

In his second novel Bjørger (1878), he attempted to imitate Bjørnstjerne Bjørnson's writing style of the Icelandic saga narrative. The melodramatic story follows a poet, Bjørger, and his love for Laura. This book was published under the pseudonym Knud Pedersen Hamsund. This book later served as the basis for Victoria: En Kærligheds Historie (1898; translated as Victoria: A Love Story, 1923).

As of 1898 Hamsun was among the contributors of Ringeren, a political and cultural magazine established by Sigurd Ibsen.

Major works
Hamsun first received wide acclaim with his 1890 novel Hunger (Sult). The semiautobiographical work described a young writer's descent into near madness as a result of hunger and poverty in the Norwegian capital of Kristiania (modern name Oslo). To many, the novel presages the writings of Franz Kafka and other twentieth-century novelists with its internal monologue and bizarre logic.

A theme to which Hamsun often returned is that of the perpetual wanderer, an itinerant stranger (often the narrator) who shows up and insinuates himself into the life of small rural communities. This wanderer theme is central to the novels Mysteries, Pan, Under the Autumn Star, The Last Joy, Vagabonds, Rosa, and others. 

Hamsun's prose often contains rapturous depictions of the natural world, with intimate reflections on the Norwegian woodlands and coastline. For this reason, he has been linked with the spiritual movement known as pantheism ("No one knows God," he once wrote, "man knows
only gods."). Hamsun saw mankind and nature united in a strong, sometimes mystical bond. This connection between the characters and their natural environment is exemplified in the novels Pan, A Wanderer Plays on Muted Strings, and the epic Growth of the Soil, "his monumental work" credited with securing him the Nobel Prize in literature in 1920.

World War II, arrest and trial
During World War II, Hamsun put his support behind the German war effort. He courted and met with high-ranking Nazi officers, including Adolf Hitler. Nazi Minister of Propaganda Joseph Goebbels wrote a long and enthusiastic diary entry concerning a private meeting with Hamsun; according to Goebbels Hamsun's "faith in German victory is unshakable". In 1940 Hamsun wrote that "the Germans are fighting for us". After Hitler's death, he published a short obituary in which he described him as "a warrior for mankind" and "a preacher of the gospel of justice for all nations."

After the war, he was detained by police on 14 June 1945, for treason, then committed to a hospital in Grimstad (Grimstad sykehus) "due to his advanced age", according to Einar Kringlen (a professor and medical doctor). In 1947 he was tried in Grimstad, and fined. Norway's supreme court reduced the fine from 575,000 to 325,000 Norwegian kroner.

After the war, Hamsun's views on the Germans during the war were a serious grief for the Norwegians, and they tried to separate their world-famous writer from his Nazi beliefs. At the trial Hamsun had pleaded ignorance. Deeper explanations involve his contradictory personality, his distaste for hoi polloi, his inferiority complex, a profound distress at the spread of indiscipline, antipathy toward the interwar democracy, and especially his anglophobia.

Death
Knut Hamsun died on 19 February 1952, aged 92, in Grimstad. His ashes are buried in the garden of his home at Nørholm.

Legacy
Thomas Mann described him as a "descendant of Fyodor Dostoyevsky and Friedrich Nietzsche." Arthur Koestler was a fan of his love stories. H. G. Wells praised Markens Grøde (1917) for which  Hamsun was awarded the Nobel Prize in Literature. Isaac Bashevis Singer was a fan of his modern subjectivism, use of flashbacks, his use of fragmentation, and his lyricism. A character in Charles Bukowski's book Women referred to him as the greatest writer who has ever lived.

A fifteen-volume edition of Hamsun's complete works was published in 1954. In 2009, to mark the 150-year anniversary of his birth, a new 27-volume edition of his complete works was published, including short stories, poetry, plays, and articles not included in the 1954 edition. For this new edition, all of Hamsun's works underwent slight linguistic modifications in order to make them more accessible to contemporary Norwegian readers. Fresh English translations of two of his major works, Growth of the Soil and Pan, were published in 1998.

Hamsun's works remain popular. In 2009, a Norwegian biographer stated, "We can’t help loving him, though we have hated him all these years ... That’s our Hamsun trauma. He’s a ghost that won’t stay in the grave."

Three of Hamsun's homes (Hamsund gård in Hamarøy, Hamsunstugu in Garmo, and Nørholm in Grimstad) are open to the public as museums, in addition to the Knut Hamsun Centre in Hamarøy.

The whereabouts of Hamsun's medal remain unknown.

Writing techniques
Along with August Strindberg, Henrik Ibsen, and Sigrid Undset, Hamsun formed a quartet of Scandinavian authors who became internationally known for their works. Hamsun pioneered psychological literature with techniques of stream of consciousness and interior monologue, as found in material by, for example, Joyce, Proust, Mansfield and Woolf.

Personal life

In 1898, Hamsun married Bergljot Göpfert (née Bech), who bore daughter Victoria, but the marriage ended in 1906. Hamsun then married Marie Andersen (1881-1969) in 1909 and she was his companion until the end of his life. They had four children: sons Tore and Arild and daughters Ellinor and Cecilia.

Marie wrote about her life with Hamsun in two memoirs. She was a promising actress when she met Hamsun but ended her career and traveled with him to Hamarøy. They bought a farm, the idea being "to earn their living as farmers, with his writing providing some additional income".

After a few years they decided to move south, to Larvik. In 1918 they bought Nørholm, an old, somewhat dilapidated manor house between Lillesand and Grimstad. The main residence was restored and redecorated. Here Hamsun could occupy himself with writing undisturbed, although he often travelled to write in other cities and places (preferably in spartan housing).

Racism and admiration for Hitler
From his youth onward, Hamsun espoused anti-egalitarian and racist beliefs. In The Cultural Life of Modern America (1889), he expressed his firm opposition to miscegenation: "The Negros are and will remain Negros, a nascent human form from the tropics, rudimentary organs on the body of white society. Instead of founding an intellectual elite, America has established a mulatto studfarm."

Hamsun wrote several newspaper articles in the course of the Second World War, including his notorious 1940 assertion that "the Germans are fighting for us, and now are crushing England's tyranny over us and all neutrals". In 1943, he sent Germany's minister of propaganda Joseph Goebbels his Nobel Prize medal as a gift. His biographer Thorkild Hansen interpreted this as part of the strategy to get an audience with Hitler. Hamsun was eventually invited to meet with Hitler; during the meeting, he complained about the German civilian administrator in Norway, Josef Terboven, and asked that imprisoned Norwegian citizens be released, enraging Hitler. Otto Dietrich describes the meeting in his memoirs as the only time that another person was able to get a word in edgeways with Hitler. He attributes the cause to Hamsun's deafness. Regardless, Dietrich notes that it took Hitler three days to get over his anger. Hamsun also on other occasions helped Norwegians who had been imprisoned for resistance activities and tried to influence German policies in Norway.

Nevertheless, a week after Hitler's death, Hamsun wrote a eulogy for him, saying “He was a warrior, a warrior for mankind, and a prophet of the gospel of justice for all nations.” Following the end of the war, angry crowds burned his books in public in major Norwegian cities and Hamsun was confined for several months in a psychiatric hospital.

Hamsun was forced to undergo a psychiatric examination, which concluded that he had "permanently impaired mental faculties," and on that basis the charges of treason were dropped. Instead, a civil liability case was raised against him, and in 1948 he had to pay a ruinous sum to the Norwegian government of 325,000 kroner ($65,000 or £16,250 at that time) for his alleged membership in Nasjonal Samling and for the moral support he gave to the Germans, but was cleared of any direct Nazi affiliation. Whether he was a member of Nasjonal Samling or not and whether his mental abilities were impaired is a much debated issue even today. Hamsun stated he was never a member of any political party. He wrote his last book Paa giengrodde Stier (On Overgrown Paths) in 1949, a book many take as evidence of his functioning mental capabilities. In it, he harshly criticizes the psychiatrists and the judges and, in his own words, proves that he is not mentally ill.

The Danish author Thorkild Hansen investigated the trial and wrote the book The Hamsun Trial (1978), which created a storm in Norway. Among other things Hansen stated: "If you want to meet idiots, go to Norway," as he felt that such treatment of the old Nobel Prize-winning author was outrageous. In 1996, Swedish filmmaker Jan Troell based the movie Hamsun on Hansen's book. In Hamsun, Swedish actor Max von Sydow plays Knut Hamsun; his wife Marie is played by Danish actress Ghita Nørby.

Studies on Hamsun's writings
Hamsun's writings have been the subject of numerous books and journal articles. Some of these writings explore the dialectic between Hamsun's literary works and his political and cultural leanings expressed in his non-fiction.

Bibliography

Non-Fiction
1889 Lars Oftedal. Udkast (Draft) (11 articles, previously printed in Dagbladet)
1889 Fra det moderne Amerikas Aandsliv (The Cultural Life of Modern America) - lectures and criticism
1903 I Æventyrland. Oplevet og drømt i Kaukasien (In Wonderland) - travelogue
1918 Sproget i Fare (The Language in Danger) - essays

Poetry
1878 Et Gjensyn (A Reunion) - epic poem (Published as Knud Pedersen Hamsund)
1904 Det vilde Kor, poetry (The Wild Choir)

Plays
1895 Ved Rigets Port (At the Gate of the Kingdom)
1896 Livets Spil (The Game of Life)
1898 Aftenrøde. Slutningspil (Evening Red: Inference Games)
1902 Munken Vendt. Brigantine's Saga I
1903 Dronning Tamara (Queen Tamara)
1910 Livet i Vold (In the Grip of Life)

Short Story Collections
1897 Siesta - short story collection
1903 Kratskog - shory story collection

Stories
1877 Den Gaadefulde. En kjærlighedshistorie fra Nordland (The Gracious. A love story from Nordland)  (Published as Knud Pedersen)
1878 Bjørger (Published as Knud Pedersen Hamsund)

Series
The Wanderer Trilogy
1906 Under Høststjærnen. En Vandrers Fortælling (Under the Autumn Star)
1909 En Vandrer spiller med Sordin (A Wanderer Plays on Muted Strings) 
1912 Den sidste Glæde (Look Back on Happiness, AKA The Last Joy)

Benoni and Rosa
1908 Benoni
1908 Rosa: Af Student Parelius' Papirer (By Student Parelius' Papers) (Rosa)

Children of the Age and Segelfoss Town
1913 Børn av Tiden (Children of the Age)
1915 Segelfoss By 1 ( 2 Volumes) (Segelfoss Town)

The August Trilogy
1927 Landstrykere (Wayfarers) (2 Volumes)
1930 August (2 Volumes)
1933 Men Livet lever (The Road Leads On) (2 Volumes)

Other Novels
1890 Sult (Hunger)
1892 Mysterier (Mysteries)
1893 Redaktør Lynge (Editor Lynge)
1893 Ny Jord (Shallow Soil)
1894 Pan (Pan)
1898 Victoria. En kjærlighedshistorie (Victoria)
1904 Sværmere (Mothwise, 1921), (Dreamers)
1905 Stridende Liv. Skildringer fra Vesten og Østen (Fighting Life. Depictions from the West and the East)
1917 Markens Grøde 2 Volumes (Growth of the Soil) 
1920 Konerne ved 2 Volumes (The Women at the Pump)
1923 Siste Kapitel (2 Volumes) (Chapter the Last)
1936 Ringen sluttet (The Ring is Closed)
1949 Paa gjengrodde Stier (On Overgrown Paths)

Nobel Prize-winning writer Isaac Bashevis Singer translated some of his works.

Film and TV adaptations
Prime among all of Hamsun's works adapted to film is Hunger, a 1966 film starring Per Oscarsson. It is still considered one of the top film adaptations of any Hamsun works. Hamsun's works have been the basis of 25 films and television mini-series adaptations, starting in 1916.

The book Mysteries was the basis of a 1978 film of the same name (by the Dutch film company Sigma Pictures), directed by Paul de Lussanet, starring Sylvia Kristel, Rutger Hauer, Andrea Ferreol and Rita Tushingham.

Landstrykere (Wayfarers) is a Norwegian film from 1990 directed by Ola Solum.

The Telegraphist is a Norwegian movie from 1993 directed by Erik Gustavson. It is based on the novel Dreamers (Sværmere, also published in English as Mothwise).

Pan has been the basis of four films between 1922 and 1995. The latest adaptation, the Danish film of the same name, was directed by Henning Carlsen, who also directed the Danish, Norwegian and Swedish coproduction of the 1966 film Sult from Hamsun's novel of the same name.

Remodernist filmmaker Jesse Richards has announced he is in preparations to direct an adaptation of Hamsun's short story The Call of Life.

Cinematized biography
A biopic entitled Hamsun was released in 1996, directed by Jan Troell, starring Max von Sydow as Hamsun.

Reviews
 Wark, Wesley K. (1980), review of Wayfarers, in Cencrastus No. 4, Winter 1980-81, pp48 & 49,

References

Further reading 
 Ferguson, Robert. 1987. Enigma: The Life of Knut Hamsun. Farrar, Straus and Giroux.
 Hamsun, Knut. 1990. Selected Letters, Volume 1, 1879-98. Edited by Harald Næss and James McFarlane. Norwich, England: Norvik Press.
 Hamsun, Knut. 1998. Selected Letters, Volume 2, 1898-1952. Edited by Harald Næss and James McFarlane. Norwich, England: Norvik Press.
Haugan, Jørgen. 2004. The Fall of the Sun God. Knut Hamsun - a Literary Biography Oslo: Aschehoug.
 Humpal, Martin. 1999. The Roots of Modernist Narrative: Knut Hamsun's Novels Hunger, Mysteries and Pan. International Specialized Book Services.
 Kolloen, Ingar Sletten. 2009. Knut Hamsun: Dreamer and Dissident. Yale University Press. 
 Larsen, Hanna Astrup. 1922. Knut Hamsun. Alfred A. Knopf.

 Shaer, Matthew. 2009. Tackling Knut Hamsun. Review of Kollen Sletten, Dreamer and dissenter and Žagar, The dark side of literary brilliance. In Los Angeles Times, 25 October 2009.
 D'Urance, Michel. 2007. Hamsun. Editions Pardès, Paris, 128 p.
 Žagar, Monika. 2009. The dark side of literary brilliance. University of Washington Press.

External links

Biographical 
 National Library of Norway Commemoration Page
 Biography, from the Norwegian Ministry of Foreign Affairs
 Hamsun bibliography 1879–2009 : literature on Knut Hamsun (National Library of Norway)
  
 Kristofer Janson and Knut Hamsun at the National Library of Norway
 Knut Hamsun's America at the Norwegian-American Historical Association
 Knut Hamsun's Early Years in the Northwest in Minnesota History Magazine
 
 "Knut Hamsun: Dreamer and Dissenter", bio and review at The New Republic, September 2010
 Knut Hamsun Online, fan-supported website

Works 
 
 Hamsun bibliography 1879–2009 published by the National Library of Norway and the University library of Tromsø
 
 List of Works
 
 
 Det Vilde Kor 1904 at the Internet Archive (Hamsun's only collection of verse)

Other 
 Wood, James, Addicted to Unpredictability, an essay. Retrieved 8 October 2006.
 Chelsea on the Edge: The Adventures of an American Theater, Davi Napoleon. Includes discussion of Ice Age, a controversial production in which Hamson is the protagonist. Iowa State University Press. , 1991.
 Norwegian Nobel Laureate, Once Shunned, Is Now Celebrated, New York Times. 27 February 2009
 

 
Trials in Norway
1859 births
1952 deaths
People from Lom, Norway
People from Hamarøy
Nobel laureates in Literature
Norwegian Nobel laureates
Norwegian male writers
19th-century Norwegian novelists
20th-century Norwegian novelists
Modernist writers
Prisoners and detainees of Norway
Norwegian prisoners and detainees
Norwegian anti-communists
Psychological fiction writers
Knut